La Reforma, or teform laws , refers to a pivotal set of laws, including a new constitution, that were enacted in Mexico during the 1850s after the Plan of Ayutla overthrew the dictatorship of Santa Anna. They were intended as modernizing measures: social, political, and economic, aimed at undermining the traditional power of the Catholic Church and the army. The reforms sought separation of church and state, equality before the law, and economic development. These anticlerical laws were enacted in the Second Mexican Republic between 1855 and 1863, during the governments of Juan Alvarez, Ignacio Comonfort and Benito Juárez. The laws also limited the ability of Catholic Church and indigenous communities from collectively holding land. The liberal government sought the revenues from the disentailment of church property, which could fund the civil war against Mexican conservatives and to broaden the base of property ownership in Mexico and encouraging private enterprise. Several of them were raised to constitutional status by the constituent Congress that drafted the liberal Constitution of 1857. Although the laws had a major impact on the Catholic Church in Mexico, liberal proponents were not opposed to the church as a spiritual institution, but rather sought a secular state and a society not dominated by religion.

The Juárez Law reduced the power that military and ecclesiastical courts held. The Lerdo Law forced land held in collective ownership to be sold to individual owners. It aimed at creating a dynamic real estate market, creating a class of yeoman farmers owning their own land, and raising revenue for the state. The measure was intended to strip the Church of most of its property, as well as to break indigenous communities' collective ownership of land.

Both of these laws were later integrated into the Constitution of 1857, which also contained many other liberal reform measures. It was published on February of that year and was meant to come into power in September. The constitution allotted considerable power to Mexican states and well as giving Congress power over the President. Conservatives pushed back against the parts of the constitution that were perceived to infringe upon the rights of the church, and controversy was further inflamed when the government mandated that all civil servants take an oath to uphold the new constitution which left Catholic public servants with the choice of either keeping their jobs or being excommunicated.

In December, a section of the army under Félix Zuloaga rebelled under the Plan of Tacubaya. The controversy that had raged throughout the year convinced President Ignacio Comonfort to accept the plan, amounting to a self coup, which recognized him as president and increased his executive powers, believing that he could bring about a compromise between radical liberals and conservatives.  When that failed, and the country began to plunge into civil war, he resigned, and the constitutional line of succession handed the presidency over to Benito Juárez, president of the Supreme Court. The War of the Reform broke out, lasting three years, between the liberal government under Benito Juárez and the conservative government under Zuloaga and others. During the war, Juárez outright nationalized most church properties in the states under his control. The war raged until December 1860, when the liberals emerged triumphant.

Almost immediately after the end of the war, Napoleon III used Juarez's suspension of foreign debts as a pretext to invade Mexico in 1862 and sought local help in setting up a client state. Seeing this as an opportunity to undo the Reform, conservative generals and statesmen joined the French and invited Habsburg archduke Maximilian to become Emperor of Mexico. Emperor Maximilian however, proved to be ideologically a liberal and actually ratified the Reform laws.  Regardless, the government of Benito Juárez resisted, and fought the French and Mexican Imperial forces with the material and financial aid of the United States. The French withdrew, leading the monarchy to collapse in 1867. The liberals achieved a decisive victory, and the Constitution of 1857 would remain in force all throughout the dictatorship of Porfirio Diaz until he was overthrown by the Mexican Revolution, when the Constitution was replaced by the Constitution of 1917, which remains in force to this day.

Background
The types of government reforms that would go on to characterize La Reforma were first attempted under the liberal presidency of Valentín Gómez Farías who assumed power in April 1833. Among a wider program of economic and social reform, the government closed church schools, assumed the right to make clerical appointments to the church, and closed monasteries. It was a time of great anti-clerical agitation led by men such as Lorenzo de Zavala and Jose Luis Mora. The measure to assume the patronato, or the right to make appointments to the Catholic Church was actually passed over Gómez Farías' opposition. Opposition to Gomez Farias’ anticlerical measures and his wider policies resulted in a series of rebellions culminating in his own vice-president, Santa Anna joining the rebels after which in April 1835, Valentin Gomez Farias fell from power through a military coup like many of his predecessors in the tumultuous era of the First Republic. The question of nationalizing church properties would hence remain mostly dormant until La Reforma.

On March 1, 1854, the Plan of Ayutla was proclaimed against the dictatorship of Antonio Lopez de Santa Anna, indicting him for his sale of the Mesilla Valley to the United States, the Gadsden Purchase; acting as a repressive dictator, and eliminating democratic institutions.  The revolution was led by Florencio Villarreal, Juan Alvarez and Ignacio Comonfort spread to many parts of the country, achieving success in October 1855. Juan Alvarez assumed the presidency on an interim basis who in turn convened a congress. An important aspect of Juan Alvarez was taking in his cabinet young liberals, thanks to it so important for the history of Mexico and Melchor Ocampo, Benito Juarez, Guillermo Prieto and Ignacio Comonfort men had the opportunity to have an active political participation. In his administration, Alvarez was dedicated to make laws that keep the country under the ideals of liberalism, as the Juárez Law, and the provision of Melchor Ocampo depriving the right to vote the clergy. For personal reasons Juan Alvarez resigned in December 1855 and left Ignacio Comonfort as responsible for the country's presidency.

Alvarez presidency

Santa Anna's dictatorship of the early 1850s was overthrown by an insurgency whose principles were laid out in the Plan of Ayutla, which contained a provision for drafting a new constitution. A government led by the liberal Juan Álvarez assumed power in November, 1855. His cabinet was radical and included the prominent liberals Benito Juarez, Miguel Lerdo de Tejada, Melchor Ocampo, and Guillermo Prieto, but also the more moderate Ignacio Comonfort.
Clashes in the cabinet led to the resignation of the radical Ocampo, but the administration was still determined to pass significant reforms.

 Juárez law or the Law on Administration of Justice and the Courts Organic Nation District and Territories: It was issued by Benito Juarez on 23 November 1855. This law was rejected by the bishops archbishops of Mexico, since it restricted ecclesiastical privileges (fueros).
 Lafragua Law or freedom of the press law: it allowed freedom of expression in print media, entered into force on 28 December 1855. It was promulgated by the Secretary of Foreign Affairs and Interior José María Lafragua.

Juárez Law 
On November 23, 1855, the Ley Juárez, named after the Minister of Justice, abolished the jurisdiction that military and ecclesiastical courts previously had over purely civil cases. Liberals criticized the existence of both courts for being biased towards their defendants. In the case of the ecclesiastical courts, their jurisdiction extended even to tenants living on extensive church-owned land, and creditors could not sue such tenants in civil court. Conservatives accused the government of hypocrisy for acting on the pretext of establishing legal equality for all, while maintaining the legal immunity that existed for members of the government.

Further dissension within liberal ranks led to Alvarez resigning in December 1856, and handing the presidency over to the more moderate Comonfort, who chose a new cabinet.

Comonfort presidency

A constituent congress first met on February 14, 1856. A motion to reestablish the Constitution of 1824 was defeated by a single vote, and a committee was formed towards the end of February to revise the constitution. The Ley Juarez was ratified in April. A provisional constitution, borrowing many principles from the Constitution of the United States, was promulgated in June.

 Decree abolished civil coercion of religious vows, promulgated April 26, 1856. 
 Decree that suppressed the Society of Jesus in Mexico, promulgated June 5, 1856.
 Lerdo law or Law of Confiscation of Property Plots and Urban Civil and Ecclesiastical Corporations: forced the civil, such as Indian communities, and ecclesiastical corporations to sell houses and land to private individuals. It was drafted by Miguel Lerdo de Tejada (brother of Sebastian Lerdo de Tejada) and was promulgated June 25, 1856. It is considered the most controversial of all the Reform laws, but it was part of a process that had been initiated during Spanish rule in the eighteenth century. 
 Lafragua Law or Civil Registration Act. Through this law, the Civil Registry was established for births, marriages, and deaths, removing these from the Roman Catholic Church which had kept records of baptism, holy matrimony, and death. It was issued on January 27, 1857.
 Constitution of 1857 was promulgated on 5 February 1857. Republican and Federalist liberal Valentín Gómez Farías, who fought for these ideals throughout his life, from the Cortes of Cádiz, the Independence of Mexico and the Constitution of 1824 had been repealed by the centralist regime and the dictatorship of Antonio López de Santa Anna. 
 Iglesias law or Rights Act and parochial perquisites: banned the collection of fees, parochial perquisites and tithe to the poor classes. It was drafted by José María Iglesias and promulgated April 11, 1857. One of Comonfort's supporters, Juan José Baz, considered this law a provocation of the lower clergy who depended on such fees.

Lerdo Law 

In June 1856, another major controversy emerged over the promulgation of the Ley Lerdo, named after the secretary of the treasury, Miguel Lerdo de Tejada, brother of fellow Liberal, and future President of Mexico, Sebastián Lerdo de Tejada. The law was aimed at the collective or corporate ownership of real estate. It forced 'civil or ecclesiastical institutions' to sell any land that they owned, with the tenants getting priority and generous terms for buying the land that they lived on. It was not only aimed at the Catholic Church, which held considerable real estate, but also at Mexico's indigenous communities that were forced to sell their communally-held lands, the ejidos.

On July 1, Archbishop Garza protested to the government that the properties were likely to be bought by a few rich individuals, argued that the church had previously lent to the government during crises, and defended the church's record of treating tenants more generously than private owners. Minister of Justice Ezequiel Montes received him courteously, but the protests resulted in no change in government policy José Julián Tornel wrote a pamphlet defending the church's role as both lender and landlord, warning that the private market in both fields would be much less generous to the public.

The law was designed to develop Mexico's economy by increasing the amount of private property owners, but in practice the land was bought up by rich speculators. Most of the lost Indian lands went to haciendas.

Freedom of religion
One of the major issues brought up during the constituent congress was that of religious toleration. The Catholic religion had been one of the three leading principles in the Plan of Iguala. Subsequently, Mexico was founded as and remained a confessional state with Catholicism as the sole religion permitted ever since the Constitution of 1824.

Deputy Lafragua, a liberal and one of Comonfort's ministers, actually argued against religious toleration, making the case that the nation was not ready for it, and feared the measure would simply provoke social upheaval. Concerns about affecting social cohesion by removing the exclusivity of Catholicism were an important theme during the debates on the topic.

A notable issue being brought up by proponents of religious toleration was that it would promote European immigration. LaFragua assured the congress that he was a proponent of immigration, but he made the case that it was not the lack of religious toleration that impeded immigration but rather the lack of security and good roads. Liberal Deputy Mata argued that religious intolerance was the only obstacle in the way of European immigration, and cited the case of a group of German colonists, consisting of thirty thousand families considering immigrating to Mexico in the wake of the 1848 Revolution, and yet ultimately opted to go to the United States due to Mexico's lack of both religious freedom and trial by jury. Deputy Zarco argued that European settlement of Mexican California could have prevented the United States from annexing that territory. He defended Deputy Mata's claims on German immigration and added his own experience in working with the Prussian minister to highlight the importance of religious toleration to the immigration question.

The issue of religious toleration was referred back to a committee in August, 1855, and the question was ultimately shelved by January 1856. The new constitution would ultimately not explicitly promise freedom of religion, yet in contrast to previous constitutions, it did not declare Catholicism the sole religion of the land, leading to a de facto state of religious freedom.

Constitution of 1857

The Constitution of 1857 was finally promulgated in February 5. It was nominally federalist, granting the states an element of sovereignty, yet it also gave the federal government more powers than the previous federalist Constitution of 1824. Congress was given the ability to impeach state governors. The previously bicameral congress was also made unicameral in order to discard the conservative leaning upper house, but also in the hopes that a single united chamber could be stronger against any autocratic tendencies coming from the executive branch. National elections were made indirect, the public choosing electors from their district who subsequently chose the congressmen, the president, and members of the supreme court.

There were also many liberal guarantees such as freedom of speech, freedom of the press, freedom of assembly, freedom of education, freedom to bear arms, and a reiteration of Mexico's prohibition of slavery. Article 123 of the Constitution read that “the federal government retains the exclusive right to exercise, in the matters of religious practice and external discipline, whatever intervention may be designated by the laws,” leading critics to ponder the exact meaning of this, and to believe that the government intended to interfere in Catholic worship.

The constitution also made itself inviolable, asserting itself binding even amidst an armed insurrection, as Mexico had experienced multiple times before. The constitution also codified the Ley Juarez and the Ley Lerdo.

As an effort to radically change the nation while still attempting to be a compromise, the constitution managed to alienate both liberals and conservatives. Melchor Ocampo, and Ignacio Ramirez both expressed dissatisfaction with the document as not progressive enough. According to Mexican historian Ignacio Altamirano, President Comonfort “did not accept the Constitution in his heart.”  Conservatives continued to decry the Ley Lerdo. On February 5, 1857, the deputies of the constituent congress and the president proclaimed the constitution, and swore an oath to it, though the document was not meant to take force until September 16. Among those present was former president and now elderly Valentin Gomez Farias who had first attempted similar reforms two decades previously.

Oath of fealty
On March 17, 1857, it was decreed that all civil servants had to publicly swear and sign and oath to the constitution. On 13 November, the Catholic Church, which had not until then taken a formal stand on the constitution, ordered the clergy to not swear allegiance to it. As for Catholic parishioners, swearing allegiance would result in excommunication. Anyone who had taken Church property under the Ley Lerdo was also excommunicated. Civil servants swearing fealty were to resign. A public retraction of fealty would restore their standing. Most government employees did take the oath; a few were fired for refusing. In the Church's view, if a Catholic "persisted in following civil authority, he was doomed to hell."

The Franco-Mexican and liberal paper Trait d'Union now proclaimed that war had been declared between church and state and featured stories on who had refused the oath, including judges and other federal civil servants. The press also noted many cases of minor and local officials also refusing the oath. Others retracted their oaths to be able to receive the sacraments during Lent, which had begun that year shortly after the decree.

Liberal officials struck back at opposition to the oath and to the constitution. Governor Juarez of Oaxaca expelled all priests who refused Catholic burial to supporters of the constitution. In Aguascalientes, vice-governor Lopez de Nava also cracked down on those refusing to take the oath by depriving them of political rights. Governor Alatriste of Puebla outright ordered public prayers for the  success of the constitutional authorities.

Conservative resistance and the Plan of Tacubaya
Amidst armed uprisings and rumors of conspiracy, on November 3, Congress granted president Comonfort autocratic powers to maintain order, and suspended among others the constitutional clauses on freedom of speech, freedom of assembly, and freedom to bear arms and the suspensions to remain in effect until April 30, 1858. Comonfort meanwhile had won the 1857 presidential election, and assumed his term as constitutional president on December 1.

On December 17 General Felix Zuloaga, from the outskirts of Mexico City proclaimed the Plan of Tacubaya, declaring the Constitution of 1857 as not in accord with the customs of the Mexican nation, and which offered to give supreme power to President Comonfort, who was to convoke a new constituent congress to produce a new constitution that was to be approved by a national plebiscite before coming into effect. The same day, congress condemned the plan and deposed Comonfort from the presidency.  Zuloaga's troops entered the capital on the 18th and dissolved congress. The following day, Comonfort accepted the role as proposed by Plan of Tacubaya, and released a manifesto making the case that more moderate reforms were needed under the current circumstances.

Juárez Presidency, 1858-1872

The Plan of Tacubaya did not lead to a national reconciliation, and as Comonfort realized that he had helped trigger a civil war he began to back away from Zuloaga and the conservatives. He resigned the presidency and left the country in January 1858, after which the constitutional presidency passed to the President of the Supreme Court, Benito Juarez. The Conservative government in the capital summoned a council of representatives that elected Zuloaga as president, and the states of Mexico proclaimed their loyalties to either Zuloaga or Juarez.

 Nationalization Law Ecclesiastical Property: This law complements Law Lerdo confiscation of church property, with an important change: the goods no longer passed into the hands of rentiers. It was issued in Veracruz on July 12, 1859. The law makes explicit the connection between the national debt and disamortization, which early nineteenth-century liberal politicians and ideologues Lorenzo de Zavala and José María Luis Mora had written about. In fact, the church held more of its wealth in mortgages to private landowners than in property ownership itself. 
 Civil Marriage Act: was issued in Veracruz on July 23, 1859, through this law was established that the religious marriage had no official validity and established marriage as a civil contract with the State, eliminating the forcible intervention priests and collection thereof by the churches.
 Organic Law on Civil Registration: registration of civil status of persons was in charge of government employees and not the Church. births and deaths as a civil contract with the State declared. It was issued in Veracruz on July 28, 1859. 
 Decree of secularization of cemeteries declared the cessation of any intervention of the clergy in cemeteries and graveyards, was released in Veracruz on July 31, 1859.
 Decree suppression of religious holidays: by this decree declared the days that were to be taken as holidays, prohibiting official assistance to religious functions. 
 Law on freedom of religion: this law Catholicism ceased to be the only one allowed. This law allowed each person was free to practice and choose the cult wished also conducting ceremonies were banned outside churches or temples. It was issued in Veracruz on December 4, 1860. 
 Expulsion decree: by which the exile Luis Clementi apostolic delegate, Archbishop José Lázaro de la Garza y Ballesteros and Pedro Espinosa, bishops and Davalos and Pedro Moreno Barajas and ordered. It was released in Mexico City on January 21, 1861. 
 Decree of hospitals and charity: for which they were secularized these properties. It was released in Mexico City on February 2, 1861. 
 Decree of secularization of nuns and friars by which throughout the republic cloisters and monasteries decreeing the exit of religious men and women living there, with the exception of the Sisters of Charity died.

War of Reform

The subsequent civil war would rage until December, 1860. Throughout the conflict there would be more measures from the liberal authorities aimed at the church, against opponents of the constitution, and attempts to build upon the reforms that had been attempted throughout the Constitution of 1857.

On June 16, 1859, governor of Zacatecas,  Jesús González Ortega passed severe decrees aimed at any priest agitating against the Constitution of 1857, prescribing the death penalty for acts including denying the sacraments to those Catholics that had taken the oath of fealty to the constitution. The death penalty was even applied to laymen who agreed to serve as witnesses for those who wished to prove that they had retracted their oaths to the constitution.

In July, 1859, at the urging of, Minister Miguel Lerdo de Tejada, President Juarez decreed outright nationalization of all church property, including land, church buildings, and even the interior furnishings. Legal pretexts were sought in the old Spanish system of law by which church property had been held in trust for the crown, whose authority over such church wealth the government argued, had now passed down to the Mexican Republic. Cemeteries were nationalized and civil marriage was instituted. Liberal generals now stripped churches of all valuables such as precious metals and gems to sell for the war effort. Sacred icons and relics were tossed into bonfires as demonstrations against superstition. The war would end in December, 1860, with the liberals triumphant.

French intervention and the Second Mexican Empire, 1862-1867

At the instigation of Mexican monarchist exiles, using Juarez' 1861 suspension of foreign debts as a pretext, and with the American Civil War preventing the enforcement of the Monroe Doctrine, Napoleon III invaded Mexico in 1862, and sought local help in setting up a client state.
Seeing this as an opportunity to undo the Reform, conservative generals and statesmen joined the French and invited Habsburg archduke Maximilian to become Emperor of Mexico. Emperor Maximilian however proved to be of liberal inclination, he ratified the Reform Laws with religious freedom being maintained and sales of church property continuing. Juarezeless, he still was willing to declare Catholicism the state religion with clergy being paid by the state after the custom of European Catholic monarchies. Negotiations with the Papal Nuncio stalled and the matter was referred back to the Vatican.
Regardless of the Emperor's liberal intentions, the government of Benito Juárez, still resisted and fought the French and Mexican Imperial forces with the backing of the United States, whom after the end of the Civil War could now once again enforce the Monroe Doctrine. The French eventually withdrew, leading the monarchy to collapse in  1867. The liberals returned to power, in a period known as the Restored Republic (1867-1876), often considered the end date of the Reform Era.

Lerdo de Tejada Presidency 
 Act of September 25, 1874

Legacy
Through the issuance of these laws and decrees Mexico was achieved in the separation of church and state. The new constitution polarized society, in December 1857 the Conservatives ignored the government and the new constitution by the Plan of Tacubaya, which began the War of the Reform or Three Years' War. Liberals achieved victory, on January 1, 1861, President Juárez returned to Mexico City. It is for this reason that several of the decrees and laws were issued in the port of Veracruz. But the country's stability was again interrupted, the government had to suspend payments on foreign debt. By the London Convention, the governments of France, Britain and Spain decided to intervene in Mexico. an agreement with the British and the Spanish, but not with the French, who with this pretext and with the help of conservatives began armed intervention and shortly after the Second Mexican Empire was achieved. Juarez was forced to flee the capital holding his itinerant government.

Economic
Liberals sought economic development under the assumption that the economy would flourish if the structure of landholding would re-ordered. For this reason, they targeted the corporate holdings of the Catholic Church and indigenous communities that held ownership in common. Liberals saw both as stumbling blocks to economic development, which they envisioned as the creation of a class of small-scale yeoman farmers. They targeted indigenous communities' material support since they sought to transform indigenous from being ethnically, socially, and economically separate from Mexico, seeking to make them individual citizens of the secular Mexican nation-state rather than members of their community. Breaking up collective indigenous community landholdings and giving community members a chance to purchase parcels held as private property was a failure. Individual community members did not have the capital to purchase such holdings, so that the buyers were largely well-off non-indigenous who could now acquire land suddenly on the market. Many buyers were large estate owners who could expand the holdings, but a number were liberals.  Although liberals sought to undermine the economic power of the Church by the forced sale of property, much of their property was urban and not rural. Miguel Lerdo de Tejada, author of the Lerdo Law, purchased disentailed Church property in Veracruz for 33,000 pesos, a significant sum.  Other liberals also acquired disentailed property worth over 20,000 pesos, including Ignacio Comonfort, José María Iglesias, Juan Antonio de la Fuente, and Manuel Payno. The land reform did not stimulate industrial development with capital now freed from investment in real estate; and it did not result in improvements in rural property since many buyers exhausted their capital on the purchase price itself. The Reform did create an expanded base of urban property owners who bought Church-owned property.  Since economic development remained a liberal goal, the disappointing lack of industrial development from domestic capital meant that pursue the program liberals had to look to foreign investors and a situation of economic dependency.

Educational
A fundamental and lasting reform was the Mexican state's commitment to free, mandatory, public, secular education. Schooling had been in the hands of the Catholic Church and targeted male elites for training as doctors, priests, and lawyers. Liberals saw education as the way to transform the lives of Mexicans by stressing literacy and numeracy for all as a means to create better citizens. Juárez viewed education as "the cornerstone of prosperity of a people; at the same time, it is the most effective way to make abuses of power impossible." They considered it the most effective way to better Mexico was to have an educated and informed citizenry that would strengthen Mexican democracy and provide a path to upward mobility for Mexicans. Benito Juárez's story of being an orphaned illiterate indigenous person rising to the presidency of Mexico was the embodiment of the power of education.  When the liberals came to power, schools of any kind were few and concentrated in urban centers.  The importance of education to the liberal project is indicated in Article 3 of the Constitution of 1857 embedding education as a top goal. Only after the turmoil of the Reform War and then the French Intervention were liberals able to begin implementing the expansion of public education.

Social
The Reform created a modern nation-state that undermined the institutional power of the Roman Catholic Church. The liberals destroyed the charitable functions of the Church, such as aid to the poor and hospitals. The state assumed no charitable functions at the time, abandoning the social welfare of the poor to the forces of exploitation. The Reform also destroyed the material basis of indigenous communities so that members no longer had access to cultivable lands and undermined the communities as functioning social entities. The Church and indigenous communities continued to exist, but their power was much curtailed by the ascendancy of the liberal nation-state.

Political
The liberals were successful in creating a lasting legal framework for reforms in the Constitution of 1857. The unsuccessful conservative challenges to the Reform meant that after 1867, liberals were entirely in control. Although liberals had hoped to create a democracy with protections for individual rights, they instead established a constitutional dictatorship under Juárez, Lerdo, and Díaz, who established political machines to ensure their continuance in power.  Historical memory in Mexico created new national heroes, but prominently Benito Juárez. Others were Melchor Ocampo, General Ignacio Zaragoza, and Miguel and Sebastián Lerdo de Tejada, Guillermo Prieto, and Vicente Riva Palacio. The Constitutionalists, winning faction of the Mexican Revolution (1910-1920) fought in defense of the Constitution of 1857. Once they consolidated power, they promulgated a new constitution to remedy problems of the Constitution of 1857 and create a legal framework to implement revolutionary changes which many had fought for. "Political liberalism became the dominant ideology and has continued to be the 'official' ideology today."

See also
 Liberalism in Mexico
 History of Roman Catholicism in Mexico
 History of Mexico

References

Further reading 

 Bazant, Jan. Alienation of Church Wealth in Mexico: Social and Economic Aspects of the Liberal Revolution 1856-75 (Cambridge University Press, 1971)
Berry, Charles R. The Reform in Oaxaca, 1856-76: A Microhistory of the Liberal Revolution. 1981.
Brittsan, Zachary. Popular Politics and Rebellion in Mexico: Manuel Lozada and La Reforma, 1855-1876. Nashville, TN: Vanderbilt University Press, 2015.
 Callcott, Wilfred H.  Liberalism in Mexico 1857-1929 (Stanford University Press, 1931)
 Hale, Charles A. Mexican Liberalism in the Age of Mora, 1821-1853. New Haven: Yale University Press, 1968.
 Hamnett, Brian R. Juarez (1994)
 Hamnett, Brian R. "Reform Laws". Encyclopedia of Mexico, 1239–41.
 Knowlton, Robert J. Church Property and the Mexican Reform 1856-1910 (Northern Illinois University Press, 1976)
 Powell, T.G. "Priests and Peasants in Central Mexico: Social Conflict during 'La Reforma'", Hispanic American Historical Review (1977) 57#2  pp. 296–313 in JSTOR
 Scholes, Walter V. Mexican Politics during the Juárez Regime 1855-1872 (University of Missouri Press, 1957)
 Sinkin, Richard N. The Mexican Reform, 1856-1876: A Study in Liberal Nation-Building (University of Texas Press, 1979)

See also 
Reform laws
Liberalism in Mexico
Constitution of 1857
War of the Reform (1858–1860)
French intervention in Mexico (1862–1867)
History of democracy in Mexico

 02
1850s in Mexico
1860s in Mexico
Second French intervention in Mexico
Liberalism in Mexico
History of Mexico
History of social movements
19th century in Mexico
Land reform